La Belle Noiseuse is a 1991 drama film directed by Jacques Rivette and starring Michel Piccoli, Jane Birkin and Emmanuelle Béart. Loosely adapted from the 1831 short story Le Chef-d'œuvre inconnu (The Unknown Masterpiece) by Honoré de Balzac, and set in present-day France, it tells how a famous old artist is stimulated to come out of retirement and do one last painting of a beautiful young woman. The film won the Grand Prix at the 1991 Cannes Film Festival.

Plot
A young would-be artist Nicolas, with his partner Marianne, are introduced by the art dealer Porbus to the aged painter Frenhofer, inactive for many years, who lives in a grand château in the south of France with his young wife Liz. Conversations are desultory, until Porbus suggests that Frenhofer might like to paint the attractive Marianne, he thinks she may be what he needs to complete his last piece, abandoned ten years ago when Liz was his model. Nicolas okays the idea, but Marianne becomes angry with Nicolas for not having asked her first before promising the master that she will model, but goes to the château the next day.

Work starts early next morning in Frenhofer's isolated studio, consisting of continual pen and wash studies on paper of Marianne in different positions, as he tries to capture the uniqueness of her body and the character of the woman within it. Over long days together their relationship varies, sometimes staying distant and sometimes getting relaxed. He progresses to working in oils on canvas, one day overpainting an unfinished study of Liz. When she sneaks into the studio one night and sees it, she is furious and hurt at the symbolism. As the object of Frenhofer's concentrated attention all day, mostly in silence, Marianne has time to rethink her relationship with Nicolas and decides she no longer needs him.

Eventually Frenhofer finishes his picture, which the film audience never sees. Once complete, the image is too powerful for Liz and for Marianne. Frenhofer hides it in a recess, which he seals with bricks and mortar, and quickly paints an innocuous version in which the face of the model is unseen. Porbus is invited to a celebratory party, after which Nicolas and the changed Marianne go their separate ways.

Cast
 Michel Piccoli as Édouard Frenhofer
 Jane Birkin as Liz Frenhofer
 Emmanuelle Béart as Marianne
  as Nicolas Wartel
 Marianne Denicourt as Julienne Wartel, Nicolas' sister
  as Porbus
 Bernard Dufour as the painter's hand

Reception
The film won the Grand Prix at the 1991 Cannes Film Festival.

The film received critical acclaim, and occasioned much comment on Béart's extensive onscreen nudity and director Rivette's characteristic use of a long running time (almost four hours).

Chicago Sun-Times film critic Roger Ebert added the film to his Great Movies collection in April 2009.

The film holds an approval rating of 100% on review aggregator site Rotten Tomatoes based on 29 reviews, with a weighted average of 8.08/10. The website's critics consensus reads: "A sensual and hypnotic masterpiece, La Belle Noiseuse luxuriates in its four-hour run time while holding audience attention."

The Japanese filmmaker Akira Kurosawa cited this movie as one of his 100 favorite films.

Alternative version
Rivette used alternative takes from the film and made changes in the scene order to produce a shorter, 125-minute version, La Belle Noiseuse: Divertimento, for television. This version was also released theatrically in some countries.

References

Further reading

External links
 
 
 

1991 films
1991 drama films
1990s English-language films
1990s French-language films
1991 multilingual films
Cannes Grand Prix winners
Films about fictional painters
Films about painters
Films based on multiple works
Films based on short fiction
Films based on works by Honoré de Balzac
Films directed by Jacques Rivette
French drama films
French multilingual films
Swiss drama films
Swiss multilingual films
1990s French films